True Tone Records may refer to:

True Tone Records (US label) was a 1950s United States record label based in New Orleans, Louisiana
True Tone Records (Australian label) was a 1980s Australian record label